Discovery science is a scientific methodology.

Discovery Science may also refer to:

TV channels
Discovery Science (European TV channel)
Discovery Science (Asian TV channel)
Discovery Science (Canadian TV channel)
Discovery Science (Indian TV channel)
Discovery Science (Latin American TV channel)
Science Channel, American TV channel formerly called Discovery Science

Science centers
 Discovery Science Place, located in Tyler, Texas
 Discovery Science Center, located in Santa Ana, California

See also

 Fort Collins Museum & Discovery Science Center
 National Institute for Discovery Science
 Discovery (disambiguation)
 Science (disambiguation)